These are the results of the women's qualification round, the preliminary round which decided the finalists for all six events for women in artistic gymnastics at the 2000 Summer Olympics in Sydney.  The qualification round took place on September 17 at the Sydney SuperDome.

The top twelve teams from the 1999 World Artistic Gymnastics Championships completed for places in the team final.  Each team was allowed to bring up to six gymnasts.  During qualification, each team could have up to five gymnasts compete on each apparatus, and could count the four highest scores for the team total.  The six teams with the highest scores in the qualification round advanced to the team final.

Individual gymnasts, including those who were not part of a team, competed for places in the all-around and apparatus finals.  The thirty-six gymnasts with the highest scores in the all-around advanced to that final, except that each country could only send three gymnasts to the all-around final.  The eight gymnasts with the highest scores on each apparatus advanced to those finals, except that each country could only send two gymnasts to each apparatus final.

In total, 97 gymnasts from 32 countries competed in the qualification round.

Results

Note: In April 2010, the IOC and FIG disqualified the Chinese team from the all-around team event after discovering member Dong Fangxiao was only 14 years old at the time of the Olympics, with Dong's results from the 1999 World Championships and 2000 Olympic Games being deleted from the records.

Finalists

Team all-around

Note: In April 2010, the IOC and FIG disqualified the Chinese team after discovering team member Dong Fangxiao was only 14 at the time of the Olympics.

Individual all-around

Note: In April 2010, the results of Dong Fangxiao from this event were struck from the records after she was found to be 14 at the time of the Olympics.

Vault

*Khorkina withdrew from the final so that her teammate Elena Zamolodchikova, who finished ninth in qualification, would take her place as she had more chances to win a gold medal.

Note: In April 2010, the results of Dong Fangxiao from  this event were struck from the records after she was found to be 14 at the time of the Olympics.

Uneven Bars

Balance Beam

Floor

Note: In April 2010, the results of Dong Fangxiao from this event were struck from the records.

References
Official Olympic Report
www.gymnasticsresults.com

Women's artistic qualification
2000
2000 in women's gymnastics
Women's events at the 2000 Summer Olympics